Thomas Anderson (born 1740) was an extensive landowner in Perth, Scotland, in the 18th century. Along with his son-in-law, future lord provost of Perth, Thomas Hay Marshall, he was responsible for the construction of much of Georgian Perth.

Career 
Anderson's acreage in Perth included the former Blackfriars land. He purchased half of the land from a Mrs Miller. With Thomas Hay Marshall, he began the first steps towards creating Tay Street when, in the late 18th century, they laid out Atholl Crescent and Atholl Street in the north and Marshall Place in the south. The sections in between were gradually filled in over the course of the next century.

Thomas Anderson was a trustee and commissioner of a project to build a new Tay bridge in 1765, employing the engineer John Smeaton. Trials were made by John Gwin. Anderson contributed £21 to a bridge fund in 1776.

Personal life 
Anderson's daughter, Rose, married Thomas Hay Marshall in 1792. Rose Terrace in Perth is now named for her. She was later adulterous, resulting in Marshall divorcing her in 1803, after eleven years of marriage.

References 

1740 births
People from Perth, Scotland
18th-century Scottish landowners